Astacidea is an infraorder of decapod crustaceans including lobsters (though not "lobsters" such as the spiny lobster etc.), crayfish, and their close relatives.

Description
The Astacidea are distinguished from most other decapods by the presence of chelae (claws) on each of the first three pairs of pereiopods (walking legs), the first of which is much larger than the remaining two pairs. The last two pairs of pereiopods are simple (without claws), except in Thaumastocheles, where the fifth pereiopod may have "a minute pincer".

Distribution
Members of the infraorder Astacidea are found throughout the world – both in the oceans and in fresh water – except for mainland Africa and parts of Asia.

Classification
Astacidea belongs to the group Reptantia, which consists of the walking/crawling decapods (lobsters and crabs).  Astacidea is the sister clade to the infraorder Polychelida, a small group of crustaceans restricted to deep waters.  The cladogram below shows Astacidea's placement within the larger order Decapoda, from analysis by Wolfe et al., 2019.

The infraorder Astacidea comprises five extant superfamilies, two of crayfish (Astacoidea and Parastacoidea), one of true lobsters (Nephropoidea), one of reef lobsters (the genus Enoplometopus), and a number of fossil taxa. , the group contains 782 recognised species, over 400 of which are in the crayfish family Cambaridae. The members of the infraorder Glypheidea (containing numerous fossils and the two extant species Neoglyphea inopinata and Laurentaeglyphea neocaledonica) were formerly included here.

The cladogram below shows Astacidea's internal relationships and the early split between lobsters and crayfish:

Taxonomy

Palaeopalaemonoidea †
Palaeopalaemonidae †
Enoplometopoidea
Enoplometopidae
Uncinidae †
Nephropoidea
Chilenophoberidae †
Nephropidae
Protastacidae †
Stenochiridae †
Astacoidea
Astacidae
Cambaridae
Cambaroididae
Cricoidoscelosidae †
Parastacoidea
Parastacidae

References

Decapods
Arthropod infraorders
Taxa named by Pierre André Latreille